Europus (or Europos) was a town in Bottiaea (later named Emathia), ancient Macedonia. It was located between Idomenae and the plains of Cyrrhus and Pella, situated on the right bank of the Axius below Idomene, where modern Evropos lies. Not far above the entrance of the great maritime plain, the site of Europus has been recognised by that strength of position which enabled it to resist Sitalces and the Thracians. We have the concurring testimony of Ptolemy and Pliny that this town of Emathia was different from Europus of Almopia.

Europos was the birthplace of Seleucus I Nikator, and two cities in Seleucid Empire were named Europos. There is also reported a Delphic proxenos Machatas from Europos in the late 4th century BCE.

The site of Europos is near the modern Evropos.

References

 The Classical Gazetteer, 1851, p. 152
 An inventory of archaic and classical poleis, 2004, p. 802 
 Seleukos Nikator by John D. Grainger, 2013, p. 4 

Bottiaea
Cities in ancient Macedonia
Populated places in ancient Macedonia
Former populated places in Greece